Bidborough Mill is a Grade II listed, house converted tower mill west of Bidborough, Kent, England. It is now incorporated into a housing development called Mill Court, on the south side of the B2176 Penshurst Road.

History

Bidborough Mill may be an eighteenth-century tower mill, or an 1858 replacement for an earlier mill. Parish records from 1759, 1763 and 1765 mention the purchase of flour for the relief of the poor. A mill was marked on Andrews, Drury and Herbert's map of 1769. The date of the building of Bidborough Mill is unknown for certain (see above). In the 1890s, the mill was being worked in conjunction with a watermill at Speldhurst. The mill had four patent sails. The mill was struck by lightning c.1900 and lost two sails. This was the end of the mill's working life and the other two sails were removed a few years later. There was a proposal to erect an iron windpump on the mill in the 1930s but this was not carried out. In 1942, the cap roof and windshaft were blown off the mill. A replacement cap was made in 1949, but later replaced with a flat roof. The mill was house converted in 2006 and a replica cap was made and fitted on 1 May 2006.

Description

Bidborough Mill is a four-storey brick tower mill, partly rendered with cement. It had a Kentish-style cap, four single patent sails and was winded by a fantail. The millstones were driven underdrift. A large pulley on the outside of the mill at first-floor level allowed the mill to be driven by belt from a traction engine or tractor, via a gear bolted to the underside of the Great Spur Wheel. A wheat cleaner and a flour dresser remained in the mill before conversion.

Millers

William Weaver 1759 - 1765
Nicholas Arnold 1839 - 1845
T Arnold 1851 - 1867
William Reeves 1870
G W Young 1874
George Wood 1878
Albert Oliver 1890 - 1891
Oliver & Morris 1895
Joseph Tabraham 1899

References for above.

References

External links
 Windmill World page on the mill.

Windmills in Kent
Grinding mills in the United Kingdom
Tower mills in the United Kingdom
Grade II listed buildings in Kent
Windmills completed in 1858